Devil Canyon is a 1.5 mile long canyon on the south slope of the San Bernardino Mountains, in San Bernardino County, California.

References

Valleys of San Bernardino County, California